The triangular boxfish (Tetrosomus concatenatus) is one of four fish species in the genus Tetrosomus in the boxfish family.

Distribution 
This species is found in the Indo-West Pacific oceans. It ranges from East Africa to southern Japan and New Caledonia.

References

Smith, M.M., 1986. Ostraciidae. p. 890-893. In M.M. Smith and P.C. Heemstra (eds.) Smiths' sea fishes. Springer-Verlag, Berlin.

Ostraciidae
Fish described in 1785
Fish of the Pacific Ocean
Fish of the Indian Ocean